The gulyás is the traditional mounted cattle-herdsman of Hungary. The gulyás tradition is associated with the Hungarian puszta and with the Hungarian Grey or Hungarian Steppe breed of Podolic cattle, now considered a meat breed but formerly used as oxen. Gulyás is the origin of the word goulash.

See also
Csikós
Betyárs
Hajduk (soldiers)

References 

Hungarian culture
Pastoralists
Animal husbandry occupations
Horse history and evolution
Horse-related professions and professionals